Belhus is a suburb of Perth, Western Australia. It is in the City of Swan local government area. It was named after Belhus Estate, the original English estate owned by the family of Edmund Barrett-Lennard, one of the pioneers of the Swan Valley table grape industry, who bought a property in the area in 1897 and named it "Belhus".

References

Suburbs of Perth, Western Australia
Suburbs and localities in the City of Swan